{{Automatic taxobox
| taxon = Diplommatinidae
| oldest_fossil = Albian
| image = Opisthostoma everettii shell.png
| image_caption = Drawing of the shell of Opisthostoma everettii from Borneo.
| authority = Pfeiffer, 1857
| subdivision_ranks = Genera
| subdivision = See text
}}

Diplommatinidae is a family of small land snails, also known as staircase snails, with an operculum, terrestrial gastropod mollusks  in the superfamily Cyclophoroidea. The Cochlostomatinae Kobelt, 1902, were previously considered a subfamily of the Diplommatinidae, but are now known to be a separate family.

Genera

Genera included within the Diplommatinidae include:

 Adelopoma Doering, 1885
 Arinia H. Adams & A. Adams, 1856
 Benigoma Kuroda, 1928
 Cardiostoma F. Sandberger, 1870 †
 Clostophis Benson, 1860
 Diancta E. von Martens, 1864
 Diplommatina Benson, 1849
 Eclogarinia Wenz, 1939
 Entypogyra Hrubesch, 1965 †
 Euthema Yu, Wang & Pan, 2018 †
 Fermepalaina Iredale, 1945
 Gastroptychia Kobelt & Möllendorff, 1900
 Habeas Simone, 2013
 Habeastrum Simone, 2019
 Helicomorpha Möllendorff, 1890
 Hungerfordia Beddome, 1889
 Laotia Saurin, 1953
 Luzonocoptis Páll-Gergely & Hunyadi, 2017
 Malarinia Haas, 1961
 Moussonia O. Semper, 1865
 Niahia Vermeulen, 1996
 Nicida W.T. Blanford, 1868
 Notharinia Vermeulen, Phung & Truong, 2007
 Occidentina Harzhauser & Neubauer, 2018 †
 Opisthostoma W. T. Blanford & H. F. Blanford, 1860
 Palaina O. Semper, 1865
 Palmatina Iredale, 1944
 Paradiancta Quadras & Möllendorff, 1895
 Plectostoma H. Adams, 1865
 Pseudonicida Hrubesch, 1965 †
 Pugnellia Oppenheim, 1895 †
 Styx Oppenheim, 1895 †
 Velepalaina'' Iredale, 1937

References 

 
Taxa named by Ludwig Karl Georg Pfeiffer